Amos Lane (March 1, 1778 – September 2, 1849) was an American lawyer and politician who served two terms as a U.S. Representative from Indiana from 1833 to 1837.

Early life and education 
Born near Aurora, New York, Lane attended the public schools.  He studied law, was admitted to the bar and commenced practice at Lawrenceburg, Indiana, in 1808.  He moved to Burlington, Kentucky, and practiced law.  He returned to Lawrenceburg, Indiana, in 1814 and continued the practice of his profession. That same year, his son James Henry Lane, was born.

Political career 
Lane was elected a member of the first Indiana House of Representatives in 1816.  He was reelected in 1817.

Lane was elected as a Jacksonian to the Twenty-third and Twenty-fourth Congresses (March 4, 1833 – March 3, 1837).
He was an unsuccessful candidate for reelection in 1836 to the Twenty-fifth Congress.

He resumed the practice of law.  He was again a member of the Indiana House of Representatives in 1839 and served as speaker.

Later life 
He died in Lawrenceburg, Indiana, September 2, 1849.  He was interred in the Lawrenceburg Cemetery.  He was reinterred in Greendale Cemetery.

References

External links
Amos Lane Letter in the collection of the Indiana State Library and Historical Bureau.

1778 births
1849 deaths
19th-century American politicians
Indiana Democratic-Republicans
Indiana lawyers
Jacksonian members of the United States House of Representatives from Indiana
Kentucky lawyers
People from Aurora, Cayuga County, New York
People from Burlington, Kentucky
People from Lawrenceburg, Indiana
Speakers of the Indiana House of Representatives